The men's 400 metres event  at the 1986 European Athletics Indoor Championships was held on 22 and 23 February.

Medalists

Results

Heats
The winner of each heat (Q) and the next 3 fastest (q) qualified for the semifinals.

Semifinals
First 2 from each semifinal qualified directly (Q) for the final.

Final

References

400 metres at the European Athletics Indoor Championships
400